Alluda Majaka is a 1995 Telugu-language action comedy film produced by Devi Vara Prasad  under the  Devi Films  banner. The film starred Chiranjeevi, Ramya Krishna and Rambha, with Kota Srinivasa Rao, Lakshmi and Ooha playing supporting roles. The movie was directed by E. V. V. Satyanarayana and the story and screenplay was by Posani Krishna Murali. The film was remade in Kannada as Kiladi.

The film generated widespread controversy upon release, with the communists and the Hindu nationalists demanding a ban on the film as it contained a number of scenes portraying women in an obscene manner. When the Central Board of Film Certification (CBFC) considered a ban on the film two months after its release, the fans of Chiranjeevi organised a protest in Hyderabad, demanding that the film not be banned. The CBFC eventually did not ban the film, but edited out the objectionable parts, the film thus achieving the dubious distinction of being one of the few films to be recalled by the CBFC. Despite the controversy, the film performed well at the box-office. The film was simultaneously dubbed into Tamil as Rowdy Boss and was also released.

Plot
Sitaram (Chiranjeevi) is the son of the benevolent patriarch of his village who has been the Panchayat President for the past thirty years. Sitaram, his family and the village community are victimized by Vasundhara (Lakshmi) and Peddaiah (Kota Srinivasa Rao). Peddaiah's NRI son, Siva (Chinna) comes to the village from the United States to see Pappi (Ramya Krishna), the eldest daughter of Vasundhara, and a girl of Peddaiah's choice for him to marry, but he decides instead to marry Sitaram's sister, Malleswari (Ooha), a traditional Telugu girl. Peddaiah agrees to the marriage after he realises that the ancestral land which Sitaram's father had distributed to the coolies contains priceless granite deposits. He demands the land as dowry days before the proposed marriage. Sitaram's father refuses to take it back from the coolies. Peddaiah cancels the marriage. Vasundhara is angered by Siva's choice but dupes the coolies, steals their land and makes a deal with Peddaiah. Siva's marriage is fixed with Pappi without his knowledge. Meanwhile, it becomes public knowledge that Malleswari is pregnant (with Siva's child). Sitaram's father kills himself when he realises that the coolies have lost their land. Sitaram and Malleswari move to the city, awaiting Siva's return.

Upon Siva's return, Malleswari is falsely arrested for prostitution before his eyes. Disgusted, Siva rejects her. Sitaram is framed (by Peddaiah) in the murder of a police officer and is subsequently sentenced to death. He escapes from custody and forcibly marries Pappi who is all set to marry Siva. With the help of a lawyer, Sivarama Krishna (Giri Babu), the estranged husband of Vasundhara, Sitaram comes out of prison on parole. He is then transformed by his father-in-law into Mr. Toyota, a rich NRI on the lookout for an Indian bride, to teach Vasundhara a lesson and to resolve the multiple crises of the film. After another arrest and dramatic escape from prison, Sitaram defeats the villains and restores order. Finally, Sivarama Krishna and Vasundhara are reunited, Malleswari marries Siva and Sitaram finds himself in a bedroom with Pappi and her younger sister Bappi (Rambha).

Cast
Chiranjeevi – Sitaramudu/Mr. Toyota/Sukhjinder's father
Lakshmi – Vasundhara
Ramya Krishna – Pappi 
Rambha – Bobby
Ooha – Malleswari
Kota Srinivasa Rao – Kota Pentaiah
Giri Babu – Lawyer Sivaramakrishna 
Brahmanandam – Abbulu/Ms. Dakota
Mallikarjuna Rao – Srisailam
Chinna – Siva
Srihari – Vasundhara's brother
Manthena Ramalingaraju  – Sitaram's father
Allu Ramalingaiah – Tata Rao
A. V. S – Konda Babu/Gundelu Mandela
Mahesh Anand
Chalapathi Rao – Chalapathi

Soundtrack

Box office
 The film opened with 120 prints and collected a gross of nearly Rs.35.6 million in its opening week. It collected Rs.4 million in Hyderabad during its first week of run itself.
 It completed 50 days in 75 centres.
 It celebrated its 100-day run in 47 centres.

References

External links
 

1990s Telugu-language films
1995 films
Indian action comedy films
Films directed by E. V. V. Satyanarayana
Films scored by Koti
Films with screenplays by Posani Krishna Murali
Telugu films remade in other languages
1995 action comedy films